Algimantas Anicetas Bučys (born September 19, 1939, Kaunas, Lithuania) is a poet, prose writer, translator, literary theorist, historian and critic of Lithuanian literature, doctor of Humanities.

Early life 
Bučys was born in Kaunas (in the so-called "temporary capital" of Lithuania). His grandfather Petras Bučys was a native of the small boyars in Samogitia (Žemaitija), but was not engaged in farming, becoming a builder of water and windmills. His father, Anicetas Bučys, already in school began to write poetry, publishing in the press in pre-war Lithuania (1918 – 1940), but at the end of World War II he found himself in exile in Britain. In London he published in Lithuanian plays and a book of poetry, actively participated in the activities of the Lithuanian emigration in London and Bradford; for services to cultural activities elected to the British Union of Lithuanian honorary member, returned to Lithuania before his death (1998). His mother, Sofija Serbentaitė was maternally from a branch of an ancient family estate Raunets (Rajunec from Upytė).

In 1957, after graduating from high school, Bučys enrolled at the University of Vilnius, where he studied Lithuanian language and literature. After graduation he was appointed a teacher of Lithuanian in the eight-year school of Bartkuškis, also taught drawing and mathematics from 1962 (because of lack of teachers). At the same time he wrote and published in the national press poems and critical articles on literature, in 1962 published his first book of poems.

Scientific specialization 
In 1964, Bučys received an invitation from the Institute of Lithuanian language and Literature to finish postgraduate studies at the Institute of World literature in Moscow (ИМЛИ). In 1968 he defended his thesis "The Problem of the novel in contemporary Lithuanian literature" for the degree of candidate of philological Sciences.

At that time the Institute had been particularly intense research in the Department of theory of literature. There was created a new academic three-volume "Theory of Literature. The main problems in historical interpretation". In this works literary genres and the laws of development of separate national literatures of Europe were considered in their original versions historical development. Already published the first volume (1962) and second (1964) and was being prepared for publication the third volume (1965; The Style, composition, literary development). The authors of the new "Theory of literature" - young and enthusiastic scientists S.  Bocharov (С. Г. Бочаров), V.  Kozhinov (В. В. Кожинов), P. Palievsky (П. В. Палиевский),  G. Gachev (Г. Д. Гачев) - at the time yet had no global fame, but the weekly discussions of new texts in the Department of theory with the participation of two or three graduate students became truly Socratic feasts of intellectual thought.

Theoretical concepts in historical perspective were associated with the revival of the ideas of Mikhail Bakhtin ( Михаил Бахтин). That's when his manuscripts were delivered to Moscow by Kozhinov and  Bocharov, when they visited in  Saransk not yet rehabilitated the scientist in his exile for participation "in a conspiracy against the Soviet government". So were brought, in old suitcases, to Moscow works of  Bakhtin, among them the two famous books on Rabelais and Dostoevsky (the second redaction). M. Bakhtin made «a true revolution" (S.Bocharov) in the poetics of prose, legalized independent existence of polyphonic voices in the novel. In the book "The Novel and Modernity” (1973, re-edition 1977, in Russian, 1977) Bučys tried to apply the ideas of Bakhtin as far as possible on the material of the Lithuanian novels of the Soviet period (1940 - 1970).

Literary activity 
In addition to works of literary criticism he has published two novels and four books of poetry. May be it was some relief from his mental cramps, because in the years of occupation (until 1990) «Bucys was best known as a well-informed and intelligent literary critic doing his best to operate within the confines of Soviet ideology. At times, he turns to the more open-ended and multilevel medium of poetry. These are his "anti-moments”, as he says in the title of the present book. In his poetry „complex transmutations of object into spirit and spirit into object, the basic poetic principle remains the same: to fill reality physically with metaphors of thought and feeling for the purpose of giving real body and substance to the visions born in one's mind.

His poems have been translated into Polish, Russian, and Serbian. In turn, he had translated into Lithuanian poetry of Polish poets K. I. Gałczyński, Julian Przyboś, Tadeusz Śliwiak, B. Drozdowski, stories by Serbian writer Grozdana Olujič, plays of Croatian writer Miroslav Krleža, Polish poet, writer, author of theatre and television screenplays Agnieszka Osiecka.

Creative work at home (1968 - 1998) from time to time was interrupted by work in various literary magazines of the Union of Lithuania writers (Bučys is a member of this Union since 1968).

International literary contacts 
Interest in the problems of national literatures amplified many literary acquaintances and connections, particularly with writers of the Caucasus and the Baltic States, as well as participation in literary conferences abroad. Trips and performances in Poland (1979, 1980), Yugoslavia (1989 at the Congress of the Pen club in Slovenia), Romania (1981), East Germany (1983 in connection with the preparation and Preface to the collection of Lithuanian short stories in German), in the USA (1985 to meet Lithuanian writers in exile), Italy (1987 as a member of the Editorial Board at the journal “Druzba narodov”; Дружба народов), West Germany (1990 together with Ch. Aitmatov, D. Granin, Fr. Alexander Men, N. Anastasiew, etc.) was reflected in numerous literary articles. In 1962 – 2014 published not only in Lithuanian, but in Russian (84), English (4), German(4), Spanish(6) Polish (7), Estonian (2), Latvian (7), Armenian (3), Bulgarian (2), Georgian (1) French (2), and Japanese (1).

Most of the articles contain a presentation of Lithuanian literature to foreign readers. One of the first (in 1969) Bučys began to write about the Lithuanian literature created in exile and banned in the Soviet Union; he prepared two volumes of the works of playwright, novelist Аntanas Škėma, wrote the foreword to his novel "Isaak", first published in English. After the restoration of independence of Lithuania, Bučys wrote the first essay on the history of Lithuanian literature, where emigration literature is presented as an organic part of a single national literature.

Comparative literature 
After twenty years of silence (from book about Lithuanian novelist Jonas Avyžius in 1990), Bučys issued (since 2008) three literary studies that emerged new methodological and cultural concepts.

Many years of close acquaintance with the writers of different nations and the works of various national literatures inevitably led to the need to find and develop new methods of studying the peculiarities of each national literature. Traditional comparative methodology, unfortunately, most often identified "similarity and resemblance" literary phenomena in different national literatures. It did not help to identify the individual identity of national literature, did not disclose its historical uniqueness. Structural comparison of very different historical experience of national literatures leads to the conclusion that the traditional "literary connections" represents only the outer side of the "invisible" internal typological interactions. A study similar ideological influence on national literature in the countries of the Soviet Union, the countries of post-war socialist camp in Europe has demonstrated the crisis of traditional comparative analysis by analogy. In these cases nothing is revealed except the statement that the monotony, the detection of the same trendy genre and stylistic standards in all of the compared national literatures (for example, a panoramic post-war novels in the manner of epic by Aleksey Tolstoy on the whole territory of the USSR and the Soviet bloc in Eastern Europe). In the discussion (1985 in Vilnius) Arthur Miller openly stated that the official ideology smoothes the creative individuality of Soviet writers, "it becomes difficult to distinguish you. It is impossible to determine your personality".

Cultural paradigms 
A new concept Bučys gradually developed  in the articles on various national literatures (Armenian, Georgian, Lithuanian, Latvian and Estonian), trying to prove that the traditional search of analogies in world literature often leaves out a proper evaluation of the most outstanding and original works of one or another national literature. That is, in his opinion, an unfortunate fate that is not deserved, for example, Lithuanian poet of the late 18th century Kristijonas Donelaitis or Croatian writer of the twentieth century Miroslav Krleža. At the same time  Bučys began to form the concept of comparative literature in contrast, not only by analogy. The theoretical basis and possibilities of comparative literature to contrast  he presented in different aspects in a special theoretical papers, the article "National identity and the global context", translated into several languages.

In 2009, there is a book "The ancient Lithuanian literature in the time of king Mindaugas", in which analysis of cultural conflicts in the collision of Lithuania in the 13th century is based on the prior experience of the analysis of the constant interactions of the "center" and "periphery". The Paganism and Christianity in the book are perceived and studied as completely independent historical and cultural paradigms, as two civilizations, two systems of thinking and values, each of which is self-sufficient and fulfilled human being. The subtitle of the book "Polyparadigmatic  research of the cultural conflicts in the Middle Ages"  specifies the subject and method of research. According to the author, any attempt to analyze these conflicts within the framework of one individual culture or a certain religious paradigm would be fruitless. In each case the research will result in a dead end. If we choose a Catholic paradigm this will only allow us to deny or belittle the importance of a different paradigm, for example, Orthodoxy or Paganism, embodying polytheism. Thus the traditional method of comparatives is given a new direction of polyparadigmatic research, whereby cultural occurrences are compared not only by analogy, but also by contrast, without giving preference to any of the phenomena being compared. In the history of culture of Lithuania, unfortunately, is still dominated by traditional monoparadigmatic method of research with catholic hierarchization, continuing the line of the Polish historiography of the 19th - 20th centuries.

In 2012, Bučys published  "History and Anthology of Ancient Lithuanian Literature" with 13 texts in old Slavonic and Church Slavonic, most of them were sacred and were never presented in the context of Lithuanian culture. Among them – medieval “Vita of Vaishvilkas”, the son of king Mindaugas, who founded in the middle of the 13th century one of the oldest monasteries of the Greek rite on the bank of the Nemunas river, and other sacred texts, devoted to forgotten or completely unknown in modern Lithuania the Orthodox saints St. Charitina of Lithuania († 1281) and St. Timothy Daumant († 1299).

Scholarly reception 
According to Lithuanian literary critic and philosopher of culture V. Daujotytė, ""here comes a very important idea in the book of  A. Bučys: conflicts have arisen and arise from the fact that the world from the middle ages, and earlier, could not and cannot agree, cannot find a common language due to various approaches and a fierce desire for a single truth. The position of the author, tested and discussed, it seems reasonable: " "the true sacral base by its nature is not compatible with any mono-paradigm“; sacred nature lies deeper than reaches the dogma of “monopartism” in religion and in the humanities. But the strong position of the "powers that be" suppress other positions, other paradigms“. According to the author, „the chronicle of the medieval ages is not one text shows a belief that all that is outside of the Christian faith, this is the world of heretics“. In the book positively says about the work of Vladimir Pashuto "Formation of the Lithuanian State" (1959); for this study, research-informed, lets see how much untruth has been written about the beginning of the statehood of Lithuania. The author reminds about the work of Edward W.Said's "Orientalism" (1978); according to A. Bučys, „we can expect a study, which, in the tradition of W.Said's, consistently and deeply will reveal a long history of creating a negative image of Paganism in the Baltic countries and ancient Lithuania". „Wherever the right is considered a single paradigm, there to its limits is narrowed world“.

The principal of Bučys: the human world (worlds) is polyparadigmatic; it is what it is today, so it was in the Middle Ages. Comparative studies, as a humanistic strategy, are obliged to study the similarities and differences that stem from the same foundation“.

Honors and awards 
1972 - Award of the Union of Soviet Writers for the best article of the year about the native literature in the foreign press. The prize was awarded in Moscow at the Congress of the International Association of Literary Critics (IULC).

1975 - State Prize of the Lithuanian SSR for the scientific work "The Novel and Modernity”.

1982 - Petras Libertas Literary Award for the novel „An enemy to your enemies“.

1990 - Awarded the honorary title "Honored artist of the Lithuanian SSR“

2000 - Award of The Open Society Fund – Lithuania (OSFL) and The Lithuanian Writers Union for the best article of the year in the cultural press.

2010 - The Lithuanian Government culture and art prize for books "Barbarians vice versa Classics" (2008),  “The ancient Lithuanian literature in the era of king Mindaugas" (2009) and other recent works.

Bibliography 
 Prie skambančių plytų. Eilėraščių rinkinys. – Vilnius, 1963 m.
 Aukštupiai: eilėraščiai. – Vilnius:  , 1967 m.
 Romanas ir dabartis: lietuvių tarybinio romano raida iki 1970 m., žanro problemos. – Vilnius: Vaga, 1977 m.
 Antiakimirka: eilėraščiai. – Vilnius: Vaga, 1977 m.
 Literatūros atvaizdai. – Vilnius: Vaga, 1979 m.
 Tik priešas tavo priešams: romanas. – Vilnius: Vaga, 1982 m. (išverstas ir išleistas Latvijoje 1986 m., Rusijoje - 1985 m., Armėnijoje - 2004).
 Literatūros savimonė: nacionalinis aspektas. – Vilnius: Vaga, 1985 m.
 Šventė be stabo: 100 eilėraščių. – Vilnius: Vaga, 1987 m.
 Tremtis: romanas. – Vilnius: Vaga, 1987 m.
 Jonas Avyžius: apybraiža. – Kaunas: Šviesa, 1990 m.
 1990 m. suomių kalba Helsinkyje išleistoje knygoje apie trijų Pabaltijo tautų literatūras parašytas skyrius apie lietuvių literatūrą Lietuvių literatūros paradoksai (vėliau  išversta ir paskelbta angliškai  žurnale Vilnius (1997, nr. 6) ir švedų kalba Švedijos literatūriniame leidinyje Ariel (1998,nr. 5-6).
 1995 m. kartu su tėvu Anicetu Bučiu, lietuvių išeivijos poetu, dramaturgu ir publicistu, sudarė  ir Lietuvoje išleido iliustruotą metraštį „Bradfordo lietuvių veikla Didžiojoje Britanijoje.1972-1995), Vilnius, Leidykla Litfondas.
 2000 m. sudarė, parengė spaudai ir Vilniuje išleido dvi JAV gyvenusio lietuvių išeivio Juozo Rudzevičiaus (1909-2001) memuarų knygas „Kai laisvė švito.1914-1918. Žmonių mentalitetas” ir „Ten gimė, augo dr. Jonas Basanavičius”. – Vilnius, Leidykla Petro ofsetas.
 Barbarai vice versa klasikai: centras ir periferija rašytojo strategijose: studijinis straipsnių rinkinys. – Vilnius: Lietuvos rašytojų sąjungos leidykla, 2008 m.
 Literatūrologinė studija „Seniausioji lietuvių literatūra. Mindaugo epocha (Poliparadigminė viduramžių kultūrinių konfliktų analizė)“. - Vilnius: Lietuvos rašytojų sąjungos leidykla, 2009.
 Literatūros istorijos monografija „Seniausios lietuvių literatūros istorija ir chrestomatija“. – Vilnius, leidykla Versus aureus, 2012. Galima skaityti elektroninį sutrumpintą variantą: https://web.archive.org/web/20160307173617/http://slaptai.lt/index.php/bucio-knyga/129-algimanto-bucio-knyga.html  
 История при свете письменности. Культурные конфликты средневековья: три литовских эпизода. Перевод с литовского: Георгий Ефремов. – Москва, изд-во Пробел, 2013. Galima skaityti elektroninio varianto skyrius: Альгимантас БУЧИС. Житие богоизбранного Войшелка. Первое литовское письменное литературное произведение. Главы из книги. Перевод Георгия Ефремова: http://magazines.russ.ru/druzhba/2012/5/b15-pr.html
 Lietuvių karaliai ir Lietuvos karalystė de facto ir de jure Viduramžių Europoje. Literatūrologinė istorinių šaltinių ir istorografijos analizė. – Vilnius: Vaga, 2018; II-asis pataisytas ir papildytas leidimas. – Vilnius: Alio, 2019
Дело о запретном королевстве. Литва: последняя языческая монархия средневековой Европы. Мариамполе:Piko valanda, 2021
Lietuvos masonai ir 1791 m. Gegužės 3-iosios konstitucijos įstatyminė pataisa" . Vilnius: Flavija, 2021

References 

1939 births
Lithuanian male poets
Vilnius University alumni
20th-century poets
20th-century Lithuanian people
Living people
Writers from Kaunas